Sahafi Football Club is a Somali football club based in Mogadishu, Somalia. They were the Somalia Cup winners in 2007. They played in the Somalia League in 2012.

History
The club was found under the name of SITT Daallo. It changed the name into Sahafi FC in 2012.

Achievements
Somalia Cup: 1
2007

Performance in UAFA competitions
Arab Champions League : 1 appearances
2012–13 – First round

References

External links
Team profile – The Biggest Football Archive of the World
Team profile – soccerway.com

Football clubs in Somalia
Sport in Mogadishu